Castle House School is an independent preparatory day school for boys and girls, first established in 1944, at Chetwynd End, Newport, Shropshire.

Character

The school is owned and operated by the Castle House School Trust Ltd, a registered charitable organization, by up to twelve governors of the Trust. It occupies a Grade II listed main building with extensive grounds. Its "Cherubs Nursery" takes pre-school children aged from two to four. From here boys and girls, in roughly equal numbers, go into the Lower School, which comprises a Reception class and Years 1 and 2. The Upper School then caters for children until they leave, usually at the age of eleven.

French is taught from the Nursery years on, and drama and dance begin in Reception. Sporting activities take place every day, and these include gymnastics.

After leaving Castle House, children typically go on to Adams' Grammar School, Newport High School, Burton Borough School, or Stafford Grammar School, with others moving to Wrekin College, Ellesmere College, Shrewsbury High School, Wolverhampton Girls' High School, Wolverhampton Grammar School, Adcote School, and others.

A new headteacher, Ian Sterling, took over the school in January 2018. The previous head, Richard Walden, was chairman in 2014 of the Independent Schools Association. Opening its annual conference in May 2014, he was critical of the state sector, claiming that "Schools are turning out too many amoral children because teachers cannot find the time to teach the difference between right and wrong." This was quickly disputed by the government's Education Secretary, Michael Gove.

Notable Old Castilians
Piers Corbyn (born 1947), conspiracy theorist
Jeremy Corbyn (born 1949), politician, leader of the Labour Party from 2015 to 2020 (younger brother of Piers Corbyn).

See also
Listed buildings in Newport, Shropshire

Notes

External links
Castle House School at education.gov.uk
Castle House School reports at ISI.net
Castle House School, Newport, gymnastics video at YouTube

Educational institutions established in 1944
1944 establishments in England
Preparatory schools in Shropshire
Private schools in Telford and Wrekin
 
Newport, Shropshire